Repossessed is a 1990 American comedy film that parodies the 1973 horror film, The Exorcist. It was written and directed by Bob Logan. The film features the original star of The Exorcist, Linda Blair, as well as Leslie Nielsen and Anthony Starke. Many gags parodied events in The Exorcist, such as the green-vomit and head-spinning scenes, and real-life events such as the televangelist scandals of the 1980s

Plot
In 1973, Father Jebediah Mayii casts out the devil from the body of young Nancy Aglet. In 1990, Nancy's body is possessed once again, while watching The Ernest and Fanny Miracle Hour, a prosperity gospel broadcast by two hucksters.

After a visit to the hospital, and a visit from Father Luke Brophy, Brophy concludes that Nancy is indeed possessed. Mayii, however, refuses to perform the exorcism, claiming he is too weak, and that both he and Nancy barely survived her previous exorcism. Brophy visits the Supreme Council for Exorcism Granting. Ernest and Fanny of The Ernest and Fanny Miracle Hour are also present. Ernest concludes that an exorcism is warranted, and convinces the council to televise Nancy's exorcism. They agree, believing it will convert millions, so Ernest presents Ernest and Fanny's Exorcism Tonight to the network.

Feeling he may be needed, Mayii visits "Bods-R-Us", a gymnasium, to restore his physical strength. There, Brophy approaches him, informs him of the televised exorcism, and attempts once more to convince Mayii to conduct the exorcism. He refuses again.

After a montage of attempts to free Nancy's body using phone donations, song, and insults, Ernest and Fanny's Exorcism Tonight is announced as having the largest audience in history. Upon hearing this, the devil, in Nancy's body, sets the studio on fire, causing the audience to flee. He reveals to Ernest and Fanny that he used them to get the largest audience, and turns them into a pantomime horse.

Using the camera, the devil tries to claim the souls of the viewing audience, but is stopped by Brophy, who destroys the camera. The devil announces he knows another way to claim their souls, and runs away, heading for a satellite transmitter. He is pursued by religious figures from around the world, who have gathered at Brophy's command. Brophy teases the devil about his defeat by Mayii.

Back in the studio, the devil uses the camera to lure Mayii to him for a rematch. The exorcism, with commentary by "Mean Gene" Okerlund and Jesse "The Body" Ventura, is ineffective until the devil mentions that he hates rock 'n roll. Turning the TV studio into a live concert, the song "Devil with a Blue Dress On" is played to the devil by the various religious figures, including The Pope on guitars. The devil is tormented so that he is finally driven from Nancy's body.

Cast
Linda Blair as Nancy Aglet
Ned Beatty as Ernest Weller  
Leslie Nielsen as Father Jebedaiah Mayii  
Anthony Starke as Father Luke Brophy  
Lana Schwab as Fanny Ray Weller
Thom J. Sharp as Braydon Aglet
Robert Fuller as Dr. Hackett
Jesse Ventura as himself  
Gene Okerlund as himself
Bob Zany as Studio Tour Guest
Jake Steinfeld as himself
Wally George as himself
Jack LaLanne as himself
Army Archerd as himself

Release
The film received a limited theatrical release in the United States by New Line Cinema in September 1990.

The film was released on VHS and laserdisc by LIVE Home Video the same year.

In 2003, Artisan Entertainment released the film on DVD. The film was re-released on DVD on April 14, 2009 by Lions Gate Entertainment, in a collection of forgotten films called the "Lost Collection".  The corporation again released the film on DVD on January 4, 2011, in a "4-Film Collection" set along with My Best Friend Is a Vampire, Slaughter High and Silent Night, Deadly Night 3: Better Watch Out!

Reception
One review came from Mick Martin and Marsha Porter's DVD and Video Guide, where they called it an "uproarious parody" and praising Nielsen's performance.

The film won a Razzie Award, the Golden Raspberry Award for Worst Original Song, for the song "He's Comin' Back (The Devil!)".

Soundtrack

References

External links

1990 films
1990s comedy horror films
American comedy horror films
American parody films
Carolco Pictures films
1990s English-language films
Films about exorcism
Films about religion
Films scored by Charles Fox
Films set in 1973
Films set in 1990
Parodies of horror
Golden Raspberry Award winning films
Religious comedy films
The Devil in film
American slapstick comedy films
1990 comedy films
Films directed by Bob Logan
1990s American films